Frederick Monroe Glade (January 25, 1876 – November 21, 1934) was a starting pitcher in Major League Baseball. From 1902 through 1908, Glade played for the Chicago Orphans (1902), St. Louis Browns (1904–1907) and New York Highlanders (1908). A native of Dubuque, Iowa, he batted and threw right-handed. He debuted on May 27, 1902, and played his final game on June 21, 1908.

In 1902 Glade appeared in one game for the Chicago National League team. He jumped to the American League in 1904 and gave four years of good services for the awful St. Louis Browns. In his rookie season he went 18–15 with a 2.27 ERA. In addition, on June 19 he set a major league game-record, since then broken, with 15 strikeouts in a 1–0 victory over the New York Highlanders. But Glade led the league with 25 losses in 1905, winning only six games with a solid 2.81 ERA. He rebounded with two winning seasons in 1906 (15-14, 2.36) and 1907 (13-9, 2.67). He was traded to the Highlanders before 1908, his last major league season.

In a six-season career, Glade posted a 52–68 record with a 2.62 ERA in  innings pitched, including 14 shutouts and 107 complete games. A good control pitcher, he recorded a 1.96 strikeout-to-walk ratio (464-to-237).

Glade died in Grand Island, Nebraska, at age 58.

Fact
On August 3, 1906 at Sportsman's Park, Glade faced Long Tom Hughes and the Washington Senators, entering the 10th inning with a scoreless tie, until Hughes decided the game with a solo home run to a 1–0 victory, becoming the first pitcher in major league history to pitch a shutout and hit a home run which accounted for the only run in the game.

External links
1904 St. Louis Browns
Baseball Library
Baseball Reference
Retrosheet

Chicago Orphans players
New York Highlanders players
St. Louis Browns players
Major League Baseball pitchers
People from Iowa
1876 births
1934 deaths
Fort Worth Panthers players
Galveston Sandcrabs players
Cedar Rapids Bunnies players
Des Moines Hawkeyes players
St. Joseph Saints players
Baseball players from Iowa